A fish sting is an injury which may include envenomation and mechanical trauma. There are a number of species of venomous fish including the stonefish.

Antivenom is available for stonefish stings.

Weeverfish sting 
Weeverfish are colorful marine animals which grow up to 1.5 feet in length. They are found in the North Atlantic Ocean and the Mediterranean Sea, and are mostly buried in sand or mud. They can cause serious wounds due to the presence of neurotoxin venom, which can lead to paralysis, seizures or even death. Immediate medical attention is recommended in case of a weeverfish sting.

See also
 Stingray injury

References

Toxicology
Fish attacks